Xinjiang Networking Transmission Limited, also known as Xinjiang Broadcast Network, consists of media broadcasting to Ürümqi and the Xinjiang province area. It operates the Urumqi People's Broadcasting Station and the Xinjiang People's Broadcasting Station, broadcasting in the Mandarin (dialect), Uyghur (dialect), Kazakh, Kyrgyz and Mongolian languages.

External links
Official Website
Official Website (translated to English with Babelfish)

Chinese-language radio stations
Mandarin-language radio stations
Mass media in Ürümqi
Radio stations in China
Uyghur-language mass media